ARV Aragua was a  for the Venezuelan Navy. Named for the Venezuelan state of Aragua, it was the leader of the 3rd Destroyer Division and the first one of her own sub-class, among British built for Venezuela naval forces in the 1950s.

Nueva Esparta-class destroyers
1955 ships
Ships built by Vickers Armstrong